Bridgnorth Endowed School is a coeducational secondary school with academy status, located in the market town of Bridgnorth in the rural county of Shropshire, England. Founded in 1503, The Endowed School is a state school and is a specialist Technology College. The age range of the school is 11–18 years. It was previously known as the Bridgnorth Grammar School, and the school celebrated the 500th anniversary of its foundation in 2003. Former pupils include Professor Peter Bullock, the inspirational soil scientist who was a member of the Intergovernmental Panel on Climate Change (IPCC).

History

16th, 17th and 18th Centuries 

Bridgnorth Endowed School was founded in 1503, in the reign of Henry VII, established as a 'common school' by the Corporation of the Borough of Bridgnorth. The revenues of the Chantries of St Leonard's Church were originally used to support the school. An annual payment of £8 from the Exchequer was assigned in perpetuity 'to a Schoolmaster keeping a grammar school' at Bridgnorth after the dissolution of the Chantries in 1548 during the reign of Edward VI. A barn, which had been used as the chapel of St John the Baptist (the new Bridgnorth Town Hall was also built in 1652 using material from a dismantled barn), first housed the school. This stood on the north side of St Leonard's churchyard outside St Leonard's Church. By the end of the sixteenth century the former chapel of St John the Baptist was being described as the 'old school-house'. The former chapel of St John the Baptist was replaced in 1595, in the reign of Elizabeth I, by the present building in St Leonard's Close known as the 'Old Grammar School' which now houses a firm of accountants. This building appears to have been erected by Sir Rowland Hayward, a sixteenth-century inhabitant of Bridgnorth who made a name for himself in business in London and became Lord Mayor of London and a Member of Parliament for the City of London. Indeed, Sir John Hayward in his will of 1635 refers to the school as having been founded by his father, Sir Rowland. Sir Rowland appears to have charged a property at Bridgnorth with an annual payment of £20 to the school, a payment later rendered by the Apley estate after Sir William Whitmore's purchase of the land in question in 1623. In 1785, during the reign of George III, the 'Old Grammar School' was renovated with gifts of £200 each given by the town's Members of Parliament, Major Whitmore and Admiral Pigot. The 'Old Grammar School' building still stands in St Leonard's Close and is currently occupied by a firm of accountants.

In 1639 during the reign of Charles I Sir William Whitmore had erected on the east side of St Leonard's Church a house of which part was to be occupied, at a nominal rent, by the Headmaster, and the remainder by the Minister of St Leonard's Church.  Sir William Whitmore's building still stands in St Leonard's Close. It has been converted into three private town houses with Grade II* listed status. The school was named by Edward Careswell of Bobbington as one of the several free grammar schools in Shropshire, also including Shrewsbury, Newport, Wem, Shifnal and Donnington (the last appears to have had only a short existence) to benefit by his will, which in 1690, during the reign of William III and Mary II devoted certain local properties to the maintenance of eighteen, later reduced to ten, scholars from these schools at Christ Church, Oxford University. These Careswell Exhibitions were first awarded in 1746, during the reign of George II. For 160 years Bridgnorth shared in the resulting close connexion between Shropshire and Christ Church, Oxford, until in 1905 the Exhibitions became tenable elsewhere.

The school was kept clean by the labour of 'a poor boy of the said School' who was paid 4 pence annually by each of his fellows; normal repairs were paid for by the town; the town also added a further £10 to the school's annual income, but when that income had to be divided between the Headmaster and the Usher (who took the younger boys) it was naturally difficult to find and still more so to keep good masters. In 1635, for instance, the school contained only six boys. The reason for the long Headmasterships of Rev. Richard Cornes from 1677 to 1726 and of Rev. Hugh Stackhouse from 1726 to 1743 was that they were both also incumbents of St Mary's Church. Rev. Stackhouse bequeathed to the Bridgnorth his collection of theological books and his memory is preserved in the name of the Stackhouse Library, the octagonal brick building with a dome, built on the northeast side of St Leonard's Church to house the collection of books which he had begun, and by a marble tablet over the building's fireplace. After 1766 no Usher was appointed; but the emoluments could not now support even a single master unless he could attract boarders to the school. Distinguished eighteenth-century alumni of the school include Bishop Thomas Percy, Bishop of Dromore and author of Reliques of Ancient English Poetry, Sir John Josiah Guest, the engineer, entrepreneur and Member of Parliament, Dr Thomas Beddoes, the physician and scientific writer, and Dr William Macmichael, physician to Kings George IV and William IV and author of The Gold-Headed Cane.

19th century 
In 1817 the Town increased its subsidy to £30, but in 1821 there were only ten boys, when the Dean of Christ Church, Oxford, who had been asked to recommend a candidate, proposed as Headmaster 24-year-old Thomas Rowley of Middleton Scriven, who had himself studied at Christ Church. Under Dr Rowley's leadership the school's reputation increased. Dr Rowley's success as a teacher of the Classics soon attracted boarders (housed in the Headmaster's House in St Leonard's Close) from far and near. His pupils included not only Bridgnorth boys, but also those from further afield. The numbers rose to about 150. In 1841 Dr Rowley was attacked by some members of the Town Council who complained of the treatment of the day-boys by the boarders and of the school's concentration on the Classics; but the Borough Treasurer wrote in Rowley's defence that the day-boys can hardly not have benefited from the specialist teachers whom Rowley was able to engage. The East Window of the St Leonard's Church was replaced in memory of Dr Rowley. Dr Rowley's successors after 1850 had not his ability, and accordingly the school's numbers and reputation, and their own emoluments, declined. Unsuccessful attempts were made to acquire some of the funds of the Careswell trust for the improvement of the school's buildings and endowments. Distinguished nineteenth-century alumni of the school include Bishop James Fraser, the reforming Bishop of Manchester, Lord Lingen, the influential civil servant, Henry John Roby, the classical scholar, writer on Roman law and Member of Parliament, General Sir Charles Warren, Commissioner of the Metropolitan Police during the period of the Jack the Ripper murders and operational commander of British forces at the Battle of Spion Kop during the Second Boer War, Reverend Robert William Eyton, Rector of Ryton and author of The Antiquities of Shropshire, Rev. Osborne Gordon, the influential Oxford don, and Bishop Francis Henry Thicknesse, the inaugural Suffragan Bishop of Leicester.

20th century 
In 1909 the school passed into the control of Shropshire County Council, the new Grammar School building at Northgate having been built in 1908. (This building still forms the core of present-day school and in 2003 a clock was placed on the outside of the building to mark the school's 500th anniversary.) In the years immediately previous to 1908 classes were held in three places - the Headmaster's House in St Leonard's Close, the Foster Memorial Institute in the High Street, and the 'Old Grammar School' building in St Leonard's Close. Until 1929 the Bridgnorth Girl's Public High School led an independent existence in the new Grammar School building at Northgate.

During the First World War some 250 old boys of the Grammar School served, of whom 39 - including three masters of the school - died. In their memory a carved oak tablet listing the dead was unveiled in the entrance hall of the Northgate building, and a further memorial in form of the school library was opened in 1930.

The Grammar School and the Bridgnorth Girl's Public High School were finally combined in 1929. The mixed school was 'transitionally aided' under the Education Act 1944; in 1955 it became voluntary controlled.

The school's name was changed from Bridgnorth Grammar School to Bridgnorth Endowed School in 1974 when it began the transition from a selective to a comprehensive intake. The new name reflected the Endowed School's history, referring to the endowments it had received. In the nineteenth century the terms endowed school and grammar school were used interchangeably as in the Endowed Schools Act 1869. In the second half of the twentieth century the Endowed School's buildings and sporting facilities on the Northgate site were greatly expanded with a new Lower School complex and a new Leisure Centre which the Endowed School had sole use of during the school day. Famous twentieth-century alumni of the school include Sir Cedric Hardwicke, the Hollywood and stage actor, Cyril Washbrook, the cricketer who played for Lancashire and England and who gained a famous record as batsman, Professor Peter Bullock, the inspirational soil scientist who was a member of the IPCC (the work of the IPCC, including the contributions of many scientists, was recognised by the joint award of the 2007 Nobel Peace Prize), and the historian John Mason.

The Contemporary School

The House System 
The Endowed School's three houses are named Rowley (red), Hardwicke (yellow) and Washbrook (green), after Dr Thomas Rowley, Sir Cedric Hardwicke, and Cyril Washbrook, CBE. There are inter-house sporting and other activities with prizes.

Extracurricular activities 
The Endowed School offers a wide range of extracurricular activities. Pupils can partake in modern, classical and musical drama productions. Instrumental lessons are also available to pupils. Pupils can take part in aerobics, athletics, badminton, basketball, bowls, cricket, cross-country running, dance, darts, gymnastics, hockey, netball, rounders, rugby, snooker, soccer, horse club, craft club, squash, swimming, and tennis. Several pupils have been recently selected for County Cricket and Athletics. There are school trips abroad. Pupils also take part in charity activities. In Autumn 1989 Emma Askins was awarded an Army Scholarship for eventual entry to RMA Sandhurst subject to clearances and examination results.<ref></</ref>

The Lower and Middle Schools 
The curriculum followed throughout years seven, eight and nine (Key Stage 3 of the National Curriculum) includes the full range of National Curriculum subjects plus a second foreign language and PHSE. In years nine, ten and eleven (Key Stage 4 of the National Curriculum) all pupils follow an extended core curriculum allowing all pupils to experience a broad range of subject areas up to the age of sixteen as well as reflecting the requirements of the National Curriculum.  All pupils in years seven to eleven are expected to wear the school uniform which includes a navy blue blazer with school badge and a house tie.  They are extremely tough on your uniform.

The Sixth Form 
Around 150 students attend the sixth form. AS and A2 subjects offered to 6th form students in years 12 and 13 include Art, Biology, Business Studies, Chemistry, Design, Drama and Theatre Studies, English Language, English Literature, French, Further Maths, geography, History, Information Technology, Maths, Music, Music Technology, Physical Education, Physics, Psychology, Religious Education, and Spanish. Year 12 students take four subjects at AS, and continue with three subjects at A2 in year 13. Sixth form pupils do not wear school uniform.

OFSTED Inspections 
The Endowed School was inspected by OFSTED in 2003 and 2008. In 2003 the inspectors' overall evaluation was that 'this is a very good school.' In 2008 the inspectors agreed with the school's own self-evaluation that the school is providing 'a satisfactory standard of education' and that 'many elements are good'. The 2003 OFSTED inspection had identified modern foreign languages as unsatisfactory. However, in 2008 the inspectors noted that there had been a 'great improvement in the leadership of modern foreign languages since the last inspection.' An OFSTED inspection has recently taken place, the school received a 'satisfactory' in most areas, pupil's behavior being one of the best, rated as 'good', while the maths department was the least achievable. OFSTED stated that the improvement in maths and English was a minor improvement and more work should be done to improve. From parents, they noted that many teachers have been on leave, saying that it disrupts their child's learning capabilities.

In 2011 the school got satisfactory (3), many of the student categories earning good, (2).

Notable former pupils

Former pupils are known as 'Old Bridgnorthians'.

 Chris Thorp (1982-), motoring journalist and executive at Jaguar Land Rover.
 Ross Antony (1974-), singer and TV entertainer in Germany.
 Dr Thomas Beddoes (1760–1808), physician and scientific writer.
 David Breakwell (1946-), cricketer.
 Professor Peter Bullock (1937–2008), soil scientist.
 Rev. Robert William Eyton (1815–1881), Rector of Ryton and author of The Antiquities of Shropshire (1853–60).
 Bishop James Fraser (1818–1885), reforming Bishop of Manchester.
 Rev. Osborne Gordon (1813–83), influential Oxford don.
 Sir John Josiah Guest, 1st Baronet (1785-1851), engineer, entrepreneur, and Member of Parliament.
 Sir Cedric Hardwicke, KBE (1893–1964), Hollywood and stage actor.
 Rob Hornby, jockey (1995-).
 David Humphries (1953-2020), cricketer.
 Ralph Lingen, 1st Baron Lingen (1819–1905), permanent secretary of the treasury.
 John Lloyd (1833–1915), barrister, local politician and political reformer in London
 Dr William Macmichael (1783–1839), physician to Kings George IV and William IV and author of The Gold-Headed Cane (1827).
 John Mason (1920–2009), historian; Student and Librarian of Christ Church, Oxford.
 Bishop Thomas Percy (1729–1811), Bishop of Dromore and author of Reliques of Ancient English Poetry (1765).
 Max Rafferty (1983-), guitarist.
 Henry John Roby (1830–1915), classical scholar, writer on Roman law, and Member of Parliament.
 Bishop Francis Henry Thicknesse (1829–1921), inaugural Suffragan Bishop of Leicester. (born Francis Henry Coldwell)
 Matthew Turner (1973- ), cricketer
 General Sir Charles Warren GCMG, KCB, FRS (1840–1927), Metropolitan Police Commissioner during the Jack the Ripper murders.
 Cyril Washbrook, CBE (1914–1999), cricketer who played for Lancashire and England.
 David York (1941-), cricketer.

See also
 List of the oldest schools in the United Kingdom
 List of the oldest schools in the world
 List of Old Bridgnorthians

References

Further reading

External links
 Official site
 Bridgnorth Endowed School General School Prospectus for Entry 2008-2009
 Bridgnorth Endowed School Sixth Form Prospectus for Entry 2008-2009
 OFSTED Inspection Report 2008
 OFSTED Inspection Report 2003

Secondary schools in Shropshire
Educational institutions established in the 1500s
1503 establishments in England
Bridgnorth
Academies in Shropshire
People educated at Bridgnorth Endowed School
Specialist technology colleges in England